RCAF Station Fort Macleod was a World War II British Commonwealth Air Training Plan (BCATP) flying training station. Administrative and operational control was the responsibility of the Royal Canadian Air Force (RCAF). The old station is located south of Fort Macleod, Alberta, Canada. 

No. 7 Service Flying Training School (SFTS) began operation in December 1940, flying the twin engine Anson. The school closed on November 17, 1944.

After the war the station remained open and hosted No. 1 Repair Equipment and Maintenance Unit (1 REMU) which was responsible for storing and repairing RCAF aircraft. The station is now Fort Macleod Airport. Many of the old buildings used during the BCATP days can still be seen. A relief landing field was located near Granum. 

Singer-songwriter Joni Mitchell was born here in 1943: her father, a flight lieutenant in the RCAF, was a flying instructor.

Aerodrome Information  
The airfield was constructed in a typical BCATP wartime pattern, with six runways formed in an overlaid triangle.  
Six runways were listed as follows:

Relief Landing Field - Granum  
The airfield was constructed in a typical BCATP wartime pattern, with three runways forming a triangle and an apron housing a combined hangar and control tower off of the northeast corner.  
Three runways were listed as follows:

Relief Landing Field - Standoff  
The airfield was constructed in a typical BCATP wartime pattern as a large grass triangle.  
Three runways were listed as follows:

References

Canadian Forces bases in Canada (closed)
Fort Macleod
Fort Macleod